Green Consolidated School near Valley City, North Dakota, United States, "is the best preserved open country consolidated school in North Dakota."  It served during 1916 to 1974.

It was listed on the National Register of Historic Places in 2011.

References

School buildings on the National Register of Historic Places in North Dakota
Schools in Barnes County, North Dakota
Defunct schools in North Dakota
National Register of Historic Places in Barnes County, North Dakota
School buildings completed in 1916